Michael Joubert was the CEO of a group of companies on the Johannesburg Stock Exchange.

Michael Joubert was a brilliant business entrepreneur of children's playground equipment and portable building units in South Africa. He built the legendary Zozo hut business. Mr. Joubert’s main company 'Zozo' had become a generic name in South Africa and the phrase zozo huts had become integrated into the South African language system.

The Joubert's gained public attention when Michael Joubert, as a romantic gesture, bought his wife one thousand long stemmed roses after the birth of their third son, Adam and the story became front page news.

Joubert immigrated to Canada from South Africa with his family in 1989. Michael Joubert died of a stroke in 2002.

References 

South African chief executives
Year of birth missing
2003 deaths